The 1999 West Oxfordshire District Council election took place on 6 May 1999 to elect members of West Oxfordshire District Council in Oxfordshire, England. One third of the council was up for election and the council stayed under no overall control.

After the election, the composition of the council was
Conservative 19
Liberal Democrats 13
Independent 10
Labour 7

Election result

Ward results

By-elections between 1999 and 2000

References

1999 English local elections
1999
20th century in Oxfordshire